A II Z were an English heavy metal band founded in 1979 in Manchester, England, by the guitarist Gary Owens. The original line-up consisted of David Owens (vocals), Gary Owens (guitar), Cam Campbell (bass), Karl Reti (drums). For a short time they were one of the forerunners of the new wave of British heavy metal movement. They disbanded in 1982.

Career
Manchester's A II Z (named after the A–Z Street Atlas) were the beneficiaries of fortuitous timing, being formed by brothers Dave (vocals) and Gary Owens (guitar), Cam Campbell (bass), and Karl Reti (drums), just in time (late 1979) to be swept up by the initial excitement surrounding the new wave of British heavy metal. Immediately signed by major label Polydor, the group, whose style bore resemblances to Motörhead, Sweet Savage and Weapon, recorded their 1980 debut album, The Witch of Berkeley, live at a hometown gig (actually the hall of Hazel Grove High School), then were sent out on the road in support of Girlschool (Iron Maiden) and Black Sabbath. Neither of these experiences aided record sales, however, and following the release by Polydor of 1981's "No Fun After Midnight" EP and the single "I'm the One Who Loves You", the band were dropped. Internal dissension had also taken root by this time and the Owens had dispensed with their original rhythm section to work with new bassist Tony Backhouse (who went on to form Mad Dogs and Mr Wolf with Wally Rumsey, ex Kruizer) and drummer Simon Wright (later of AC/DC) on that final single. But the quartet's new and more commercial AOR direction failed to bear fruit, and by the middle of 1982 A II Z had dissolved. Guitarist Gary Owens joined the similarly ill-fated NWOBHM band Tytan.

In 1993, Reborn Classics reissued The Witch of Berkeley as a bootleg CD which includes both singles as well as a four-track demo from Jaguar. In 2006 Majestic Rock officially re-released The Witch of Berkeley and also included the two singles and their b-sides.

Discography

Studio albums
The Witch of Berkeley (live) LP (Polydor 1980)

Singles and EPs
"No Fun After Midnight" 7"/12" (Polydor 1981)
"I'm the One Who Loves You" 7" (Polydor 1981)

Reissue
The Witch of Berkeley Bootleg CD (1993 Reborn Classics)
The Witch of Berkeley CD (2006 Majestic Rock)

See also
List of New Wave of British Heavy Metal bands

References

External links
 [ Entry in AllMusic]
 VH-1 article entry
 NWOBHM.com entry

English heavy metal musical groups
Musical groups established in 1979
Musical groups disestablished in 1982
Musical groups from Manchester
New Wave of British Heavy Metal musical groups